Aliwal North Hospital is a 50-bed government funded District hospital that renders level 1 care to patients in the catchment area of the Maletswai Local Municipality in Aliwal North, Eastern Cape in South Africa.

Aliwal North is situated on the N6 between East London and Bloemfontein in the north. The Aliwal North hospital is situated on the main road (Somerset Street) leading through town to Jamestown and neighboured by the Aliwal North High School and its hostel on the southern end of the town. Aliwal North Hospital serves a population estimated at 43 000.

The hospital departments include Emergency department, Paediatric ward, Gynecology and Maternity wards, Surgical Services, Medical Services, Operating Theatre & CSSD Services, Forensic Pathological Services, Pharmacy, Anti-Retroviral (ARV) treatment for HIV/AIDS, Post Trauma Counseling Services, X-ray Services, Physiotherapy, NHLS Laboratory, Oral Health Care Provides, Physiotherapy, Laundry Services, Kitchen Services and Mortuary.

References
Eastern Cape Department of Health website - Joe Gqabi District Hospitals

Hospitals in the Eastern Cape
Joe Gqabi District Municipality